Chris Dempsey is an American professional mixed martial artist who last competed in 2021. A professional since 2012, he has competed for the UFC and Bellator MMA.

Background
Born and raised in Pennsylvania, Dempsey played football, and also competed in wrestling growing up as a youngster. He was a two time All-American at University of Pittsburgh at Johnstown, where he also earned a degree in political science. He began training in mixed martial arts part-time as a college student in 2008.

Mixed martial arts career

Early career
Dempsey made his debut as an amateur in 2011, winning three fights before turning professional in 2012.

He fought primarily for regional promotions in Western Pennsylvania where he compiled a record of 10-1 competing in both the light heavyweight and middleweight divisions before signing with the UFC on the summer of 2014.

Ultimate Fighting Championship
Dempsey made his promotional debut as a short notice replacement against Ilir Latifi on July 19, 2014, at UFC Fight Night 46, filling in for Tom Lawlor. Latifi effectively used leg kicks to disable his opponent, before finishing him with punches, ending the fight by a first round knockout.

Dempsey next faced Eddie Gordon in a middleweight bout on April 18, 2015, at UFC on Fox 15. He won the fight via split decision.

Dempsey returned to the light heavyweight division as a short notice replacement to face promotional newcomer Jonathan Wilson on August 8, 2015, at UFC Fight Night 73, filling in for Jared Cannonier. He lost the fight knockout in the first round.

Dempsey faced Scott Askham on February 27, 2016, at UFC Fight Night 84. He lost the fight by knockout in the first round and was subsequently released from the promotion.

Bellator MMA
In his Bellator debut, Dempsey faced undefeated prospect Ed Ruth on November 3, 2017, at Bellator 186. He lost the fight via knockout in the second round.

Mixed martial arts record

|-
|Loss
|align=center|11–7
|Rex Harris
|TKO (punches)
|247 FC: Flood City Fight Night
|
|align=center|1
|align=center|1:58
|Johnstown, Pennsylvania, United States
|
|-
|Loss
|align=center|11–6
|Ed Ruth
|KO (punch)
|Bellator 186
|
|align=center|2
|align=center|0:27
|University Park, Pennsylvania, United States
|
|-
|Loss
|align=center|11–5
|Adam Hunter
|KO (punches)
|Gladiators of the Cage MMA 21
|
|align=center|1
|align=center|0:40
|Pittsburgh, Pennsylvania, United States
|
|-
|Loss
|align=center|11–4
|Scott Askham
|KO (punch and head kick)
|UFC Fight Night: Silva vs. Bisping
|
|align=center|1
|align=center|4:45
|London, England
|
|-
|Loss
|align=center|11–3
|Jonathan Wilson
|KO (punches)
|UFC Fight Night: Teixeira vs. Saint Preux
|
|align=center|1
|align=center|0:50
|Nashville, Tennessee, United States
|
|-
|Win
|align=center|11–2
|Eddie Gordon
|Decision (split)
|UFC on Fox: Machida vs. Rockhold
|
|align=center|3
|align=center|5:00
|Newark, New Jersey, United States
|
|-
|Loss
|align=center|10–2
|Ilir Latifi
|KO (punches)
|UFC Fight Night: McGregor vs. Brandão
|
|align=center|1
|align=center|2:07
|Dublin, Ireland
|
|-
|Win
|align=center|10–1
|Nick Krauss
|TKO (punches)
|Gladiators of the Cage: Road to Glory 6
|
|align=center|3
|align=center|4:11
|Johnstown, Pennsylvania, United States
|
|-
|Win
|align=center|9–1
|Muhammad Abdullah
|Submission (guillotine choke)
|Gladiators of the Cage: North Shore 4
|
|align=center|2
|align=center|0:56
|Pittsburgh, Pennsylvania, United States
|
|-
|Win
|align=center|8–1
|Tiawan Howard
|Submission (north-south choke)
|Gladiators of the Cage: North Shore 3
|
|align=center|1
|align=center|4:51
|Pittsburgh, Pennsylvania, United States
|
|-
|Win
|align=center|7–1
|Tenyeh Dixon
|TKO (punches)
|Gladiators of the Cage: Road to Glory 5
|
|align=center|2
|align=center|1:27
|Cheswick, Pennsylvania, United States
|
|-
|Win
|align=center|6–1
|Lewis Rumsey
|Decision (unanimous)
|Gladiators of the Cage: North Shore 2
|
|align=center|3
|align=center|5:00
|Pittsburgh, Pennsylvania, United States
|
|-
|Winn
|align=center|5–1
|Dervyn Lopez
|Decision (unanimous)
|Gladiators of the Cage: Road to Glory 5
|
|align=center|3
|align=center|5:00
|Cheswick, Pennsylvania, United States
|
|-
|Win
|align=center|4–1
|Christopher Wing
|Decision (unanimous)
|Xtreme Caged Combat: Mayhem
|
|align=center|3
|align=center|5:00
|Philadelphia, Pennsylvania, United States
|
|-
|Win
|align=center|3–1
|Chase Owens
|Decision (unanimous)
|Gladiators of the Cage: North Shore
|
|align=center|3
|align=center|5:00
|Pittsburgh, Pennsylvania, United States
|
|-
|Loss
|align=center|2–1
|Mojtaba Najim Wali
|Submission (armbar)
|Caged Power 2
|
|align=center|3
|align=center|1:45
|Morgantown, West Virginia, United States
|
|-
|Win
|align=center|2–0
|Marcus Finch
|Decision (split)
|Gladiators of the Cage: Road to Glory 2
|
|align=center| 3
|align=center| 5:00
|Kittanning, Pennsylvania, United States
|
|-
|Win
|align=center|1–0
|Eddie Hardison
|Submission (rear-naked choke)
|American MMA Fight League 4: Fight Night
|
|align=center|2
|align=center|2:57
|West Newton, Pennsylvania, United States
|
|-
|}

Grappling record

See also
 List of current Bellator fighters
 List of male mixed martial artists

References

External links

1987 births
Living people
People from Sewickley, Pennsylvania
American male mixed martial artists
Mixed martial artists utilizing wrestling
Mixed martial artists from Pennsylvania
Ultimate Fighting Championship male fighters